Samih Yalnızgil, also known as Samih Rıfat (1875 – 1932) was a Turkish linguist and politician, who was one of the founders of the Turkish Language Association, which he also served as its president. He was the father of renowned poet Oktay Rifat.

References 

1875 births
1932 deaths
Academics from Istanbul
Place of death missing
20th-century Turkish politicians
Politicians from Istanbul
Linguists from Turkey